The Lübeck Marienkirche (officially St Marien zu Lübeck) is a medieval basilica in the city centre of Lübeck, Germany. Built between 1265 and 1352, the church is located on the highest point of Lübeck's old town island within the Hanseatic merchants' quarter, which extends uphill from the warehouses on the River Trave to the church. As the main parish church of the citizens and the city council of Lübeck, it was built close to the town hall and the market.

The church was built as a three-aisled basilica with side chapels, an ambulatory with radiating chapels, and vestibules like the arms of a transept. The westwork has a monumental two-tower façade. It has the tallest brick vault in the world, the height of the central nave being .

St Mary's epitomizes north German Brick Gothic and set the standard for about 70 other churches in the Baltic region, making it a building of enormous architectural significance. It is referred to as the "mother church of brick Gothic" and is considered a major work of church building in the Baltic Sea region. Because of its architectural importance and testimony to the medieval influence of the Hanseatic League (of which Lübeck was the de facto capital), in 1987 St Mary's Church was inscribed on the UNESCO World Heritage List along with the Lübeck City Centre. St Mary's is part of the Evangelical Lutheran Church in Northern Germany.

History of the building

In 1160, Henry the Lion moved the Bishopric of Oldenburg to Lübeck and established a cathedral chapter in the south of the old city island.
 
After 1160, a wooden church was built on the site of the Marienkirche in the middle of the town, which was first documented in 1170 together with St. Petri as a market church. Already at the end of the 12th century it was replaced by a Romanesque brick church that existed until the middle of the 13th century. Romanesque sculptures from the furnishings of this second Marienkirche are now on display in the St. Annen Museum. The sixth pair of pillars in the nave (from the west) dating from around 1200 can be seen as a remnant of the Romanesque Marienkirche in today's High Gothic building.

The design of the three-aisled basilica was based on the Gothic cathedrals in France (➜Reims) and Flanders, which were built of natural stone. St. Mary's is the epitome of ecclesiastical Brick Gothic architecture and set the standard for many churches in the Baltic region, such as the St. Nicholas Church in Stralsund and St. Nicholas in Wismar.

No one had ever before built a brick church this high and with a vaulted ceiling.
The lateral thrust exerted by the vault is met by buttresses, making the enormous height possible. The motive for the Lübeck town council to embark on such an ambitious undertaking was the acrimonious relationship with the Bishopric of Lübeck. 

The church was built close to the Lübeck Town Hall and the market, and it dwarfed the nearby Romanesque Lübeck Cathedral, the church of the bishop established by Henry the Lion. It was meant as a symbol of the desire for freedom on the part of the Hanseatic traders and the secular authorities of the city, which had been granted the status of a free imperial city, making the city directly subordinate to the emperor, in 1226. It was also intended to underscore the pre-eminence of the city in relation to the other cities of the Hanseatic League, which was being formed at about the same time (1356).

The Chapel of Indulgences was added to the east of the south tower in 1310. It was both a vestibule and a chapel and, with its portal, was the church's second main entrance from the market.
Probably originally dedicated to Saint Anne, the chapel received its current name during the Reformation, when paid scribes moved in. It has often been compared to English Gothic Cathedral Architecture and the chapter house of Malbork Castle. Today the Chapel of Indulgences serves the community as a church during winter, with services from January to March.

It was in this chapel, from the large pew that still survives, that the newly elected council used to be installed. On the upper floor of the chapel is the treasury, where important documents of the city were kept. This part of the church is still in the possession of the town.

Before 1444, a chapel consisting of a single bay was added to the eastern end of the ambulatory, its five walls forming five-eighths of an octagon. This was the last Gothic extension to the church.

In total, St Mary's Church has nine larger chapels and ten smaller ones that serve as sepulchral chapels and are named after the families of the Lübeck city council that used them and endowed them.

Destruction and restoration

Among the artefacts destroyed was the famous  (Danse Macabre organ), an instrument played by Dieterich Buxtehude and probably Johann Sebastian Bach. Other works of art destroyed in the fire include the Mass of Saint Gregory by Bernt Notke, the monumental Danse Macabre, originally by Bernt Notke but replaced by a copy in 1701, the carved figures of the rood screen, the Trinity altarpiece by Jacob van Utrecht (formerly also attributed to Bernard van Orley) and the Entrance of Christ into Jerusalem by Friedrich Overbeck. Sculptures by the woodcarver Benedikt Dreyer were also lost in the fire: the wooden statues of the saints on the west side of the rood screen and the organ sculpture on the great organ from around 1516–18 and Man with Counting Board. 

Photographs by Lübeck photographers like  give an impression of what the interior looked like before the War.

The glass window in one of the chapels has an alphabetic list of major towns in the pre-1945 eastern territory of the German Reich. Because of the destruction it suffered in World War II, St. Mary's Church is one of the Cross of Nails centres. A plaque on the wall warns of the futility of war.

The church was protected by a makeshift roof for the rest of the war, and the vaulted ceiling of the chancel was repaired. Reconstruction proper began in 1947, and was largely complete by 1959. In view of the previous damage by fire, the old wooden construction of the roof and spires was not replaced by a new wooden construction. All church spires in Lübeck were reconstructed using a special system involving lightweight concrete blocks underneath the copper roofing. The copper covering matched the original design and the concrete roof would avoid the possibility of a second fire. A glass window on the north side of the church commemorates the builder, who invented this system.

In 1951, the 700th anniversary of the church was celebrated under the reconstructed roof; for the occasion, Chancellor Konrad Adenauer donated the new tenor bell, and the Memorial Chapel Against War with broken bells in the South Tower was inaugurated.

In the 1950s, there was a long debate about the design of the interior, not just the paintings (see below). The predominant view was that destruction had restored the essential, pure form. The redesign was intended to facilitate the dual function that St. Mary's had at that time, being both the diocesan church and the parish church. At the meeting, the bishop, vehemently – and successfully – demanded the removal of the Fredenhagen altar (see below).

The redesign of the interior according to Boniver's plans was carried out in 1958–59. Since underfloor heating was being installed under a completely new floor, the remaining memorial slabs of Gotland limestone were removed and used to raise the level of the chancel. The Fredenhagen altar was replaced by a plain altar base of muschelkalk limestone and a crucifix by Gerhard Marcks suspended from the transverse arch of the ceiling. The inauguration of the new chancel was on 20 December 1959.

At the same time, a treasure chamber was made for the Danzig Parament Treasure from St. Mary's Church in Danzig (now Gdańsk), which was transferred to Lübeck after the War. The Parament Treasure is now exhibited at St. Anne's Museum), where a large organ loft had been built. The organ itself was not installed until 1968.

The gilded roof spire, which extends  higher than the nave roof, was recreated from old designs and photographs in 1980.

Lothar Malskat and the frescos
The heat of the blaze in 1942 dislodged large sections of plaster, revealing the original decorative paintings of the Middle Ages, some of which were documented by photograph during the Second World War.
In 1948 the task of restoring these gothic frescos was given to Dietrich Fey. In what became the largest counterfeit art scandal after the Second World War, Fey hired local painter Lothar Malskat to assist with this task, and together they used the photographic documentation to restore and recreate a likeness to the original walls. Since no paintings of the clerestory of the chancel were available, Fey had Malskat invent one. Malskat "supplemented" the restorations with his own work in the style of the 14th century. The forgery was only cleared up after Malskat reported his deeds to the authorities in 1952, and he and Fey received prison sentences in 1954.
The major fakes were later removed from the walls, on the instructions of the bishop.

Lothar Malskat played an important part in the novel The Rat by Günter Grass.

Interior decoration

St. Mary's Church was generously endowed with donations from the city council, the guilds, families, and individuals. At the end of the Middle Ages it had 38 altars and 65 benefices.
The following mediaeval artefacts remain:
Until 1942 it was at the west end of the church; it is now in the middle of the chancel. It holds , almost the same as a Hamburg or Bremen beer barrel, which holds .
 Darsow Madonna from 1420, heavily damaged in 1942, restored from hundreds of individual pieces, put back in place again in 1989
Winged altarpiece by Christian Swarte with Woman of the Apocalypse, now installed behind the main altar
 Bronze burial slab by Bernt Notke for the Hutterock family (1505), in the Prayer Chapel in the north ambulatory
 Of the rood screen destroyed in 1942 only an arch and the stone statues remain: Elizabeth with John the Baptist as a child, Virgin and Child with Saint Anne, the Archangel Gabriel and Mary (Annunciation), John the Evangelist and St. Dorothy.
The Last Supper relief includes a detail associated with Lübeck: a little mouse gnawing at the base of a rose bush. Touching it is supposed to mean that the person will never again return to Lübeck  – or will have good luck, depending on the version of the superstition.
 John the Evangelist, a wooden statue by Henning von der Heide
 St. Anthony, a stone statue, donated in 1457 by the town councillor , a member of the Brotherhood of St. Anthony
 Remains of the original gothic pews in the Burgomasters' Chapel in the southern ambulatory
 The Lamentation of Christ, one of the main works of the Nazarene Friedrich Overbeck, in the Prayer Chapel in the north ambulatory
 The choir screens separating the choir from the ambulatory are recent reconstructions. The walls that had been built for this purpose in 1959 were removed in the 1990s. The brass bars of the choir screens were mostly still intact, but the wooden parts had been almost completely destroyed by fire in 1942. The oak crown and frame were reconstructed on the basis of what remained of the original construction.

Antwerp altarpiece

The  in the Lady Chapel (Singers' Chapel) was created in 1518.
It was donated for the chapel in 1522 by Johann Bone, a merchant from Geldern.
After the chapel was converted into a confessional chapel in 1790, the altarpiece was moved around the church several times.
During the Second World War, it was in the Chapel of Indulgences and thus escaped destruction.
The double-winged altarpiece depicts the life of the Virgin Mary in 26 painted and carved scenes.
 The fully closed position (nowadays, this is the position in the Christian Holy Week before Easter Sunday), shows the Annunciation by the Master of 1518.
With one pair of wings open (as seen on fasting days) the paintings are of scenes from the lives of Jesus and Mary:
in the centre are four paintings, depicting,
 the Adoration of the Shepherds
 the Adoration of the Magi
 the Circumcision of Jesus, and
 the Flight into Egypt
 and the wings show
 the marriage of Joachim and Anne,
 the rejection of Joachim's sacrifice,
 Joachim's sacrifice of thanksgiving, and
 Joachim giving alms to the poor on leaving the temple.
With both pairs of wings open (on feast days):
 the carved centrepiece depicts
 the Death of the Virgin Mary,
 with the death scene in the centre;
 above that was a group depicting the Assumption of Mary but it was stolen in 1945;
 below it is the funeral procession;
 on the left is the Annunciation, and
 on the right is Mary's entombment.
 the carved left wing depicts
 the birth of Mary at the top and
 the Presentation of Jesus at the Temple at the bottom, and
the carved right wing depicts
 the Tree of Jesse above, and
 the twelve-year-old Jesus in the temple below.
Before 1869, the wings of the predella, which depict the legends of the Holy Kinship were removed, sawn to make panel paintings, and sold. In 1869, two such paintings from the private collection of the mayor of Lübeck  were acquired for the collection in what is now St. Anne's Museum.
Of the remaining paintings, two are in the Staatsgalerie Stuttgart and two are in a private collection in Stockholm.

Memorials

In the renaissance and baroque periods, the church space contained so many memorials that it became like a hall of fame of the Lübeck gentry. Memorials in the main nave, allowed from 1693, had to be made of wood, for structural reasons, but those in the side naves could also be made of marble. Of the 84 memorials that were still extant in the 20th century, almost all of the wooden ones were destroyed by the air raid of 1942, but 17, mostly stone ones on the walls of the side naves survived, some heavily damaged. Since these were mostly baroque works, they were deliberately ignored in the first phase of reconstruction, restoration beginning in 1973. They give an impression of how richly St. Mary's church was once furnished.
After the phase of exuberant cartilage baroque, the examples of which were all destroyed by fire, Thomas Quellinus introduced a new type of memorial to Lübeck and created memorials in the dramatic style of Flemish High Baroque for
 the councillor , made in 1699;
 the councillor , made in 1706;
 the mayor  (who died in 1704) and
 the mayor  (1707),
the last one being the only one to remain undamaged.
In the same year, the Lübeck sculptor  created the memorial for councillor  (who had died in 1705), whose oval portrait is held by a winged figure of death.

The Sepulchral Chapel of the Tesdorpf family contains a bust by Gottfried Schadowof mayor , which the Council presented to him in 1823 on the occasion of his anniversary as a member of the Council, and which was installed here in 1835.
Among the later memorials is also the gravestone of mayor  by Landolin Ohmacht.

The Fredenhagen Altarpiece

After a lengthy debate lasting from 1951 to 1959, the bishop at the time, prevailed, and it was decided not to restore the altar but to replace it with a simple altar of limestone, with a bronze crucifix made by Gerhard Marcks.
Speaking of the historical significance of the altar, the director of the Lübeck Museum at the time said that it was the only work of art of European stature that the Protestant Church in Lübeck had produced after the Reformation.

Individual items from the altarpiece are now in the ambulatory: the Calvary group with Mary and John, the marble predella with a relief of the Last Supper and the three crowned figures, the allegorical sculptures of Belief and Hope, and the Resurrected Christ.
The other remains of the altar and altarpiece are now stored over the vaulted ceiling between the towers.
The debate as to whether it is possible and desirable to restore the altar as a major work of baroque art of European stature is ongoing.

Stained glass

 
Except for a few remains, the air raid of 1942 destroyed all the windows, including the stained glass windows that Carl Julius Milde had installed at Saint Mary's after they were rescued from the  when the St. Mary Magdalene's Priory was demolished in the 19th century, and including the windows made by Professor  from Frankfurt in the late 19th century.
In the reconstruction, simple diamond-pane leaded windows were used, mostly just decorated with the coat of arms of the donor, though some windows had an artistic design.
 The windows in the Singers' Chapel (Lady Chapel) depict the coat of arms of the Hanseatic towns of Bremen, Hamburg and Lübeck, and the lyrics of Buxtehude's Lübeck cantata,  (BuxWV 96).
 The window of the Memorial chapel in the South Tower (which holds the destroyed bells), depicts coats of arms of towns, states and provinces of former eastern territories of Germany.
 Both windows in the Danse Macabre Chapel, which were designed by Alfred Mahlau in 1955/1956 and made in the Berkentien stained glass atelier in Lübeck, adopt motifs from the Danse Macabre painting that was destroyed by fire in 1942. It was manufactured by the Munich court stained glass artist  and depicted the confirmation of the town privileges by Emperor Barbarossa.
 In 1981–82, windows by Johannes Schreiter were installed in the Chapel of Indulgences. Their ragged diamond pattern evokes not only the destruction of the church but also the torn nets of the Disciples.
 In December 2002, the tympanum window was added above the north portal of the Danse Macabre Chapel after a design by Markus Lüpertz.
This window, like the windows by Johannes Schreiter in the Chapel of Indulgences, was manufactured and assembled by Derix Glass Studios in Taunusstein.

Churchyard

The architectural features include the subjects of Lübeck legends; a large block of granite to the right of the entrance was supposedly not left there by the builders but put there by the Devil.

To the north and west of the church, the courtyard is now an open space, mediaeval buildings having been removed.
In the late 1950s, it was decided not to reconstruct it, and the remaining external walls of the ruins were cleared away.

The war memorial, created in 1929 by the sculptor  1929 on behalf of the congregation of the church to commemorate their dead, is made of Swedish granite from Karlshamn.
The inscription reads (in translation):

Pastors
Since the Reformation, St. Mary's Church has been where the top Lutheran clergyman of the city preached.
Until 1796 this was the superintendent.
After that, Lübeck's senior clergymen varied; three of them were pastors at St. Mary's
Since the establishment of the North Elbian Evangelical Lutheran Church, St. Mary has been where the provost responsible for Lübeck has preached.
Since the establishment of the Evangelical Lutheran Church in Northern Germany in 2012 St. Mary's has been the church of the provost for the area of Lübeck within the church district of Lübeck–Lauenburg.

 1532–1548: 
 1553–1567: 
 1575–1600: 
 1613–1622: 
 1624–1643: Nicolaus Hunnius
 1646–1671: 
 1675–1683: 
 1689–1698: 
 1702–1728: 
 1730–1767: Johann Gottlob Carpzov
 1771–1774: 
 1779–1796: 
 1892–1909: 
 1914–1919: 
 1919–1933: 
 1934–1945: , bishop
 1948–1955: , bishop
 1956–1972: 
 1972–1977: , senior clergyman
 1979–2001: , provost
 2001–2008: Ralf Meister, provost
 Since 2008: Petra Kallies, provost

Other famous pastors at St. Mary's were:
 1614–1648: , priest from 1614, principal pastor from 1625
 1626–1668: Jacob Stolterfoht, priest from 1626, principal pastor from 1649
 1706–1743: , principal pastor and Polyhistor
 1743–1750: , priest
 1751–1759: , principal pastor
 1829–1867: , principal pastor
 1832–1884: 
 1966–1979: 

Once there were three generations in succession:
 1713–1750: , priest from 1713, principal pastor from 1743
 1757–1795: , priest from 1757, principal pastor from 1775, senior clergyman from 1788
 1794–1828: , 1794 priest, from 1800 principal pastor.

Music at St. Mary's
Music played an important part in the life of St. Mary's as far back as the Middle Ages. The Lady Chapel (Singers' Chapel), for instance, had its own choir.
After the Reformation and Johannes Bugenhagen's Church Order, the Lübeck Katharineum school choir provided the singing for religious services.
In return the school received the income of the chapel's trust fund.
Until 1802, the cantor was both a teacher at the school and responsible for the singing of the choir and the congregation.
The organist was responsible for the organ music and other instrumental music; he also had administrative and accounting responsibilities and was responsible for the upkeep of the building.

Main organ

St. Mary's is known to have had an organ in the 14th century, since the occupation "organist" is mentioned in a will from 1377.
The old great organ was built in 1516–1518 under the direction of Martin Flor on the west wall as a replacement for the great organ of 1396. It had 32 stops, 2 manuals and a pedalboard.
This organ, "in all probability the first and only Gothic organ with a thirty-two-foot principal (deepest pipe, 11 metres long) in the western world of the time",  was repeatedly expanded and rebuilt over the centuries.
For instance, the organist and organ-builder Barthold Hering (who died in 1555) carried out a number of repairs and additions; in 1560/1561 Jacob Scherer added a chest division with a third manual.
From 1637 to 1641, Friederich Stellwagen carried out a number of modifications.
 added three registers in 1704.
In 1733, Konrad Büntung exchanged four registers, changed the arrangement of the manuals and added couplers.
In 1758, his son,  added a small swell division with three voices, the action being controllable from the breast division manual.
By the beginning of the 19th century the organ had 3 manuals and a pedalboard, 57 registers and 4,684 pipes.
In 1851, however, a completely new organ was installed – built by Johann Friedrich Schulze, in the spirit of the time, with four manuals, a pedalboard, and 80 voices, behind the historic organ case by Benedikt Dreyer, which was restored and added to by Carl Julius Milde.
This great organ was destroyed in 1942 and was replaced in 1968 by what was then the largest mechanical-action organ in the world. It was built by Kemper & Son.
The tracker action operates electrically and has free combinations; the stop tableau is duplicated.

Danse macabre organ (choir organ)

The Dance macabre organ was older than the old great organ.
It was installed in 1477 on the east side of the north arm of the "transept" in the Danse Macabre Chapel (so named because of the Danse Macabre painting that hung there) and was used for the musical accompaniment of the requiem masses that were celebrated there. After the Church Reformation it was used for prayers and for Holy Communion services.
In 1549 and 1558 Jakob Scherer added to the organ among other things, a chair organ, and in 1621 a chest division was added.
Friedrich Stellwagen also carried out extensive repairs from 1653 to 1655. Thereafter, only minor changes were made.
The  of the organ was changed back to what it had been in the 17th century.
But, like the main organ, this organ was also destroyed in 1942.

In 1955 the organ builders Kemper & Son restored the Danse Macabre organ in accordance with its 1937 dimensions, but now in the northern part of the ambulatory, in the direction of the raised choir.
Its original place is now occupied by the astronomical clock.
This post-War organ, which was very prone to malfunction, was replaced in 1986 by a new Danse Macabre organ, built by Führer Co. in Wilhelmshaven and positioned in the same place as its predecessor.
It has a mechanical tracker action, with four manuals and a pedalboard, 56 stops and approximately 5,000 pipes. 
This organ is particularly suited for accompanying prayers and services, as well as an instrument for older organ music up to Bach.

As a special tradition at St Mary's, on New Year's Eve the chorale Now Thank We All Our God is accompanied by both organs, kettledrums and a brass band.

Other instruments
There used to be an organ on the rood screen, as a basso continuo instrument for the choir that was located there – the church's third organ.
In 1854 the breast division that was removed from the Great Organ (built in 1560–1561 by Jacob Scherer) when it was converted was installed here.
This "rood screen organ" had one manual and seven stops and was replaced in 1900 by a two-manual pneumatic organ made by the organ builder Emanuel Kemper, the old organ box being retained. This organ, too, was destroyed in 1942.

In the Chapel of Indulgences there is a chamber organ originally from East Prussia. It has been in the chapel since 1948.
It has a single manual and eight voices, with separate control of bass and descant parts.
From there it was acquired by Lübeck organ builder Karl Kemper in 1933.
For a few years it was in the choir of St. Catherine's Church, Lübeck.
Then, Walter Kraft brought it, as a temporary measure, to the Chapel of Indulgences at St. Mary's, this being the first part of the church to be ready for church services after the War.
Today this organ provides the accompaniment for prayers as well as the Sunday services that are held in the Chapel of Indulgences from January to March.

Organists
Two 17th-century organists, especially, shaped the development of the musical tradition of St. Mary's:
Franz Tunder from 1642 until his death in 1667, and his successor and son-in-law, Dieterich Buxtehude, from 1668 to 1707.
Both were defining representatives of the north German organ school and were prominent both as organists and as composers.
In 1705 Johann Sebastian Bach came to Lübeck to observe and learn from Buxtehude, and Georg Friedrich Händel and Johann Mattheson had already been guests of Buxtehude in 1703.
Since then, the position of organist at St. Mary's Church has been one of the most prestigious in Germany.

With their evening concerts, Tunder and Buxtehude were the first to introduce church concerts independent of religious services. Buxtehude developed a fixed format, with a series of five concerts on the two last Sundays of the Trinity period (i.e. the last two Sundays before Advent) and the second, third, and fourth Sunday in Advent.
This very successful series of concerts was continued by Buxtehude's successors, Johann Christian Schieferdecker (1679–1732),  (1696–1757), his son  (1720–1781) and Johann Wilhelm Cornelius von Königslöw.

For the evening concerts they each composed a series of Biblical oratorios, including  [Israel's Idol Worship in the Desert] (1758), Absalon (1761) and Goliath (1762) by Adolf Kunzen and '' [The Finding of Baby Moses] and  [The Saviour of the World is born] (1788),  [Death, Resurrection and Judgment] (1790), and  [David's Lament on Mount Hermon (Psalm 42)] (1793) by Königslöw.

Around 1810 this tradition ended for a time. Attitudes towards music and the Church had changed, and external circumstances (the occupation by Napoleon's troops and the resulting financial straits) made such expensive concerts impossible.

In the early 20th century it was the organist Walter Kraft (1905–1977) who tried to revive the tradition of the evening concerts, starting with an evening of Bach's organ music, followed by an annual programme of combined choral and organ works.

The tradition of evening concerts continues today under the current organist (since 2009), Johannes Unger.

List of organists
  1516–1518 (?) Barthold Hering
 –1572: David Ebel
 1597–1611: Heinrich Marcus
 1612–1616: 
 1616–1640: Peter Hasse
 1642–1667: Franz Tunder
 1668–1707: Dietrich Buxtehude
 1707–1732: Johann Christian Schieferdecker
 1733–1757: 
 1757–1781: 
 1781–1833: 
 1834–1844: 
 1845–1886: 
 1887–1929: 
 1929–1973: Walter Kraft
 1973–2009: 
 since 2009:

The Lübeck Boys Choir at St. Mary’s
The Lübeck Boys Choir at St. Mary’s has been at St. Mary’s since 1970. The choir sings regularly at services on Sundays and religious festivals. The performance of the St John Passion on Good Friday has become a Lübeck tradition as well as the concerts Nachtklänge, taking place twice each summer, and the Weihnachtssingen, happening four times each December.

St. Mary’s Church, Lübeck, today

Congregation
Since the establishment of Johannes Bugenhagen's Lutheran Church Order by the town council in 1531 St. Mary has been Protestant. Today it is the main church of the Lübeck district of the Evangelical Lutheran Church of Northern Germany. Services are held on Sundays and Church festivals from 10 o'clock.
From Mondays to Saturdays in the summer season and in Advent there is a short prayer service with organ music at noon (after the parade of the figures of the Astronomical Clock), which tourists and locals are invited to attend.
Since 15 March 2010 there has been an admission charge of two euros for visitors.

Astronomical clock

The astronomical clock was built in 1561–1566. It used to stand in the ambulatory behind the high altar, but was completely destroyed in 1942. Only a clock dial that was replaced during a previous restoration remains, in St. Anne's Museum.
The new Astronomical Clock was installed on the East side of the Northern transept, in the Danse Macabre Chapel. It is the work of Paul Behrens, a Lübeck clockmaker, who planned it as his lifetime achievement from 1960 to 1967. He collected donations for it, made the clock, including all its parts, and maintained the clock until his death. The clock front is a simplified copy of the original.
Calendar and planetary discs controlled by a complicated mechanical movement show the day and the month, the position of the sun and the moon, the signs of the zodiac (the thirteen astronomical signs, not the twelve astrological signs), the date of Easter, and the golden number.

At noon, the clock chimes and a procession of figures passes in front of the figure of Christ, who blesses each of them. The figures originally represented the prince-electors of the Holy Roman Empire; since the post-War reconstruction, they represent eight representatives of the peoples of the world.

Carillon
After the War, a carillon with 36 bells was installed in the South Tower.
Some of the bells came from St Catherine's Church in Danzig (now Gdańsk, Poland).
On the hour and half-hour, choral melodies are played, alternating according to the season.
Formerly the carillon was operated by a complicated electromechanical system of cylinders; the mechanism is now computer-controlled. At Christmas and Easter, the organist plays the clock chimes manually.

Bells

During the fire in the air raid of 1942, the bells are reported to have rung again in the upwind before crashing to the ground.
The remains of two bells, the oldest bell, the "Sunday bell" by Heinrich von Kampen (diameter , strike tone a0) and the tenor bell by Albert Benningk from 1668 (diameter , strike tone a0F#0), were preserved as a memorial in the former Schinkel Chapel, at the base of the South Tower
Today it hangs in the tower of what is now the University of Lübeck hospital.

The set of bells in the North Tower now consists of seven bells.
It ranks among the largest and deepest-pitched of its kind in northern Germany.
After the Second World War, these bells from the "Hamburger bell cemetery" were hung in the tower as temporary replacement bells.

In 1951 the German Chancellor, Konrad Adenauer donated a new tenor bell. In 1985 three additional bells were made, completing the set. They have inscriptions referring to peace and reconciliation.

In 2005, the belfry was renovated. The steel bell frame from the reconstruction was replaced with a wooden one and the bells were hung directly on wooden yokes, so that the bells ring out with more brilliance.

This great peal is easily recognised because of the unusual disposition (intervals between the individual bells); the series of whole tone steps between bells 1–5 results in a distinctive sound with added vibrancy due to the tone of the historic bells.

See also
 List of tallest structures built before the 20th century

Notes

References

Bibliography

English sources

German sources

Indirect German sources

Citations referring to the following are indirect citations via the German Wikipedia article.

The German article cites the following references:

External links

 Official Web site 

Buildings and structures completed in 1350
14th-century churches in Germany
Lubeck Mary
Lubeck Mary
Churches in Lübeck
Lubeck Mary
Heritage sites in Schleswig-Holstein